Glasgow Gaels Gaelic Football Club or Glasgow Gaels GFC (Irish: Cumann Peile Ghaeil Ghlaschú) is a Gaelic Athletic Association club based in Glasgow. The team is a member of the Scottish GAA and are one of the most successful Scottish teams of all time. They currently cater for both Men's Gaelic football, junior and senior levels, Ladies' Gaelic football, and Juvenile Gaelic Football. The teams have competed in the All Britain championships, reaching the Men's All-British semi-finals in 2006. After defeating Dunedin Connollys in the 2022 Scottish Senior Championship Final, they marched on to achieve a historic first for the club winning the All-British Championship before losing out narrowly to Stewarstown Gaels from Tyrone in the Junior All Ireland Quarter Final. In 2016, the ladies won the All-British Junior Final after being runners-up in 2015. The ladies made history in 2016 by winning their first ever Scottish Senior League Title. In 2016, the ladies were also victorious against the European Champions, Belgium GAA, and advanced to the All-Ireland Quarter Final against Dublin's St. Maurs. The Junior Men made history with their first ever league and championship titles in 2016, defeating Dunedin Connollys on both occasions.  The following year the juniors achieved a double winning the League and Championship in 2017, defeating Connollys and Dalriada respectively. They retained the junior championship in 2022. They are currently associated with Glasgow University GAA and Stirling University GAA. They have also been featured on Joe.ie's "80 clubs around the World" in 2016.       

Home matches are currently played in Clydebank Sports Hub, which is a state-of-the-art 4G sports facility one of the first in Scotland for GAA. The club has a thriving social scene and can be seen on weekends in many of the hot spots around Glasgow.

Origins
Glaschu Gaels GFC was formed in 1999 after the amalgamation of two local sides, Glencovitt Rovers and Paisley Gaels.

Honours
Ladies Junior All-Ireland Series: quarter-finalists - 2016
Ladies Junior European Championship: winners - 2016
Men's All British Championship winners - 2022
Men's All-British Championship: finalists - 2019
Ladies All-British Junior Championship: finalists - 2015, winners - 2016
Men's Scottish Senior Championship: winners - 2002, 2006, 2019, 2022 finalists - 2004, 2005, 2007, 2008, 2009, 2011, 2015, 2016, 2017,2019, 2020, 2021
Ladies Scottish Senior Championship: winners - 2006, finalists - 2007
Men's Scottish Junior Championship: winners - 2016, 2017, 2022
Ladies Scottish Junior Championship: winners - 2015, 2016
Men's Scottish Senior League: winners - 2003, 2005, 2008, 2019 finalists - 2015, 2016, 2017, 2018
Men's Scottish Junior League: winners - 2016, 2017
Men's Senior North of Britain League: winners - 2019
Ladies Scottish League: finalists - 2015, 2017 winners - 2016
U14 Scottish Championship: shield finalists - 2015, 2016
U12 Scottish Championship: shield finalists - 2016, 2017 winners - 2015
Men's Scottish Seven-a-side: winners - 2005, 2007, 2009
Ladies Scottish Seven-a-side: winners - 2015, 2017
Pearse Cup (now the Morkan cup) - winners - 2002, 2003, 2004
O'Fiach Cup - winners - 2003
Michael Davitt Shield winners - 2000, 2001, 2002, 2005
Glasgow Women's Celtic Sports Festival - 2006, 2009

References

External links
 

Gaelic football clubs in Scotland
Sports teams in Glasgow
1999 establishments in Scotland
Gaelic Athletic Association clubs established in 1999